Hitachino may refer to:

Hitachino-Ushiku Station, a railway station in Tsuchiura, Ibaraki Prefecture
Hitachino Nest Beer, beer produced by Kiuchi Brewery

See also
Hitachi (disambiguation)